Karin Booth (born June Francis Hoffman, June 19, 1916 – July 27, 2003) was an American film and TV actress of the 1940s to 1960s.

Life and career
She was born June Francis Hoffman on June 19, 1916, in Minneapolis, Minnesota to Francis T. and Ebba V. Hoffman. She lived in Portland and Los Angeles, attending John Marshall High School. She began her career modeling and being a chorus girl in 1939 and was signed under contract to Paramount Pictures in 1941 under the name Katharine Booth.

After changing her screen name to Karin Booth in 1942, she would go onto appear in such feature films as The Unfinished Dance (1947), Big City (1948), The Cariboo Trail (1950), Tobor the Great (1955) and The World Was His Jury (1958). She also appeared on television in Alfred Hitchcock Presents, Perry Mason, M Squad, The Lineup, and This Is The Life. She was considered a Joan Crawford look-alike at the start of her career and was often seen courting with Sterling Hayden, John Hodiak, and Mickey Rooney.

In 1948, she married Allan Pinkerton Carlisle, a well-known and prominent sportsman from Palm Beach, Florida, and had 2 sons, Allan (born November 3, 1950) and Robert (born May 3, 1961). She was expecting a middle child in 1959 but lost the baby unexpectedly while filming Beloved Infidel. She retired in 1964 and lived the rest of her days in the community of Jupiter, Florida, where she died on July 27, 2003 and was cremated with her ashes scattered at sea.

Filmography

 Glamour Boy (1941) – Helen Trent
 Louisiana Purchase (1942) – Louisiana Belle
 The Unfinished Dance (1947) – La Darina
 Big City (1948) – Florence Bartlett
 My Foolish Heart (1950) – Miriam Ball
 State Penitentiary (1950) – Shirley Manners
 The Cariboo Trail (1950) – Francis Harris
 Last of the Buccaneers (1950) – Belle Summer
 Cripple Creek (1952) – Julie Hanson
 Let's Do It Again (1953) – Deborah Randolph
 Charge of the Lancers (1954) – Maria Sand
 Jungle Man-Eaters (1954) – Dr. Bonnie Crandall
 Tobor the Great (1954) – Janice Roberts
 African Manhunt (1955) – Ann Davis
 Seminole Uprising (1955) – Susan Hannah
 Top Gun (1955) – Laura Mead
 The Crooked Sky (1957) – Sandra Hastings
 Alfred Hitchcock Presents: Last Request (1957) – Sheila Raymond
 The World Was His Jury (1958) – Polly Barrett
 Badman's Country (1958) – Lorna Pardee
 Juke Box Rhythm (1959) – Leslie Anders
 Beloved Infidel (1959) – Janet Pierce

References

External links
 

1916 births
2003 deaths
Actresses from Minneapolis
Female models from Minnesota
Western (genre) film actresses
American film actresses
American television actresses
20th-century American actresses
Burials at sea
21st-century American women